The Bay Hen 21 is an American trailerable sailboat that was designed by Reuben Trane as a pocket cruiser and first built in 1984.

Production
The design was built by a series of builders in the United States, but it is now out of production. These include the Florida Bay Boat Company 1984–1987, Mirage Fiberglass 1988–1991, 
Custom Fiberglass 1992–1997, Sovereign America 1997 and Nimble Boats 1998–2003.

Design
The boat is based upon the Lightfoot Sharpie open boat daysailer that was designed by Bob Johnson, creator of the Island Packet Yachts series of boats. The Florida Bay Boat Company, owned by Trane bought the molds and Trane designed a new deck and cabin for the hull to create the Bay Hen 21.

The Bay Hen 21 is a recreational sharpie, built predominantly of fiberglass, with wood trim. It is a gaff rigged catboat with a single mainsail; a plumb stem; an angled transom; a shallow-draft, transom-hung rudder controlled by a tiller and twin, retractable centerboards, mounted side by side in separate trunks. It displaces  and carries no ballast.

The boat is normally fitted with a small  outboard motor, mounted in a  stern well, which is forward of the rudder, for docking and maneuvering.

The design has sleeping accommodation for two people, with a double berth in the cabin, that can be folded into a settee. The galley is located under the companionway ladder and is a pull-out design. A hatch is provided forward for ventilation.

Operational history
In a 2010 review Steve Henkel praised the large cockpit and the aft outboard motor well. He wrote, "the boat handles like a typical flat-bottomed sharpie, pounding a bit going upwind, and her shallow sharpie rudder can result in considerable weather helm in a breeze. Construction quality may vary from one model year to another, since several different builders came and went."

See also
List of sailing boat types

Related development
Marsh Hen
Peep Hen 14

References

Sharpies
1980s sailboat type designs
Sailing yachts
Trailer sailers
Sailboat type designs by Reuben Trane
Sailboat types built by Sovereign Yachts
Sailboat types built by the Florida Bay Boat Company
Sailboat types built by Mirage Fiberglass
Sailboat types built by Nimble Boats